Heinrich Freudweiler, a Swiss portrait and genre painter, was born at Zurich in 1755, and was first instructed by H. Wüst; he afterwards studied at the Academies at Düsseldorf and Mannheim, and visited Dresden and Berlin, where he became acquainted with Graf and Chodowiecky. In 1785 he returned to Zurich, and died in 1795. He painted several historical scenes relating to his country.

References
 

1755 births
1795 deaths
18th-century Swiss painters
18th-century Swiss male artists
Swiss male painters
Swiss portrait painters
Genre painters
Kunstakademie Düsseldorf alumni
Artists from Zürich